Natasha Jessica Stott Despoja AO (born 9 September 1969) is an Australian politician, diplomat, advocate and author. She is the founding Chair of the Board of Our Watch, the national foundation to prevent violence against women and their children, and was previously the Australian Ambassador for Women and Girls at the Department of Foreign Affairs and Trade from 2013 to 2016. She was also a Member of the World Bank Gender Advisory Council from 2015 to 2017 and a Member of the United Nations High Level Working Group on the Health and Human Rights of Women, Children and Adolescents in 2017. She is a member of the UN Committee on the Elimination of Discrimination against Women.

Stott Despoja began her parliamentary career after being appointed to the Senate at the age of 26 serving as an Australian Democrats Senator for South Australia from 1995 to 2008. She went on to serve as the Deputy Leader and Leader of the Australian Democrats. She holds the record for being the youngest woman to sit in the Parliament of Australia and the longest serving Australian Democrats Senator.

Early life and education
Stott Despoja was born in Adelaide on 9 September 1969. She is the daughter of Shirley Stott Despoja, an Australian-born journalist and Mario Despoja, who was from Croatia (then part of Yugoslavia). She attended Stradbroke Primary and Pembroke School and later graduated from the University of Adelaide in 1991. She was President of the Students' Association of the University of Adelaide (SAUA) and the South Australian Women's Officer for the National Union of Students. She then went on to work as a political advisor to Senator John Coulter and Senator Cheryl Kernot.

Political career
When John Coulter had to stand down for health reasons in 1995, Stott Despoja was the successful candidate to replace him. Her performance was recognized when she was re-elected not only in the 1996 election the following year, but again in the 2001 election. In 1997 she had been promoted to become the deputy leader of the Democrats from her position as party spokesperson for parliamentary portfolios such as Science and Technology, Higher Education, IT, Employment & Youth Affairs.

During the passage of the Goods and Services Tax (GST) legislation in 1999, Stott Despoja, along with Andrew Bartlett, split from the party's other senators by opposing the package, which had been negotiated by Lees and prime minister John Howard. She said that she refused to break promises made by the party during the election. The party had gone to the election stating that they would work with whichever party formed government to improve their tax package. The Australian Democrats traditionally permitted parliamentary representatives to cast a conscience vote on any issue but, on this occasion, close numbers in the Senate placed greater pressure than usual on the dissenters.

In 2004, Stott Despoja took 11 weeks' leave from the Senate following the birth of her first child before returning to full duties as Democrat spokesperson on, inter alia, Higher Education, Status of Women, and Work and Family.

During her political career she also introduced 24 Private Member's Bills on issues including paid maternity leave, the Republic, genetic privacy, stem cells, captioning and same sex marriage. Stott Despoja regularly attends the Sydney Gay and Lesbian Mardi Gras.

On 22 October 2006, after undergoing emergency surgery for an ectopic pregnancy, she announced that she would not be contesting the 2007 election to extend her term beyond 30 June 2008. She was the Australian Democrats' longest-serving senator. Her retirement coincided with the ending of her party's federal parliamentary representation; the Democrats' support had collapsed after 2002 and they won no seats at the 2004 and 2007 half-senate elections.

Party leadership
Stott Despoja became the leader of her party on 6 April 2001. The preceding leader Meg Lees left the party in the following year. Stott Despoja faced criticism with calm resolution from Democrat senators and the general public, but she opted to resign on 21 August 2002 after 16 months. She had been faced with little alternative after four of her six colleagues - the so-called "Gang of Four" - forced a ten-point reform agenda upon her. The agenda was proposed by John Cherry and she was opposed to its content. She announced her resignation in a speech to the Senate, concluding with a "pledge to bring the party back home to the members again", and referring to her colleagues' attitude towards her.

She was replaced as leader by Bartlett following a membership ballot interval during which Brian Greig acted in the position.

Post-political career
Stott Despoja has been a casual host on ABC 891 radio, a guest panellist on Channel 10's The Project and a columnist for the Australian business news website Business Spectator.

She was a board member of non-profit organisations the South Australian Museum (SAM) from 2009 to 2013; the Museum of Australian Democracy (MOAD) from 2010 to 2013; and the Advertising Standards Board (ASB) from 2008 to 2013. She was a deputy chair at beyondblue (Australia's national depression initiative).
She has been an ambassador for Ovarian Cancer Australia (OCA), The Orangutan Project (TOP); Cancer Australia; secondbite; and the HIV/AIDS anti-stigma campaign, ENUF, (along with her husband Ian Smith).

She was on the board of the Burnet Institute (Australia's largest virology and communicable disease research institute) from 2008 until December 2013, when Foreign Minister Julie Bishop announced the appointment of Stott Despoja as Australia's new Ambassador for Women and Girls, a role she held until 2016. This involved visiting some 45 countries to promote women's economic empowerment and leadership and to help reduce violence against women and girls.

Stott Despoja has also been an election observer for the US-based National Democratic Institute (NDI) in Nigeria (2011); visited Burkina Faso for Oxfam (2012); and went to Laos (2011) and Burma (2013) with The Burnet Institute. She was mentioned in June 2014 as a possible replacement for Kevin Scarce as the next Governor of South Australia, however Hieu Van Le was chosen.

In July 2013, Stott Despoja was the founding chair of Our Watch, originally named Foundation to Prevent Violence Against Women and their Children. She left the position in July 2021, and was appointed life patron in August 2022. Our Watch is a joint initiative of the Victorian and Commonwealth Governments, based in Melbourne. It is an independent non-profit organisation that is now jointly funded by all states and territories of Australia, after the New South Wales Government was the last state government to join the organisation in 2019.

Continuing roles

On 21 July 2015, Stott Despoja returned to the Burnet Institute as a Patron.

 she is still a columnist for The Advertiser and an Honorary Visiting Research Fellow at The University of Adelaide. In 2010, she taught winter school at The University of Adelaide with former Foreign Minister, Alexander Downer, "The Practice of Australian Politics".

 Stott Despoja is on the Advisory Board of the Australian Privacy Foundation (APF) and the Global Women's Institute Leadership Council.

In November 2020, Stott Despoja was elected to the UN Committee on the Elimination of Discrimination against Women, becoming the first Australian member in 28 years.

Writing

Stott Despoja has authored a large number of essays, reports and non-fiction works on a range of topics, both during and since her political career.

In March 2019 she published On Violence, with the publisher's blurb asking "Why is violence against women endemic, and how do we stop it?". Stott Despoja posits that violence against women is "Australia's national emergency", with one woman dying at the hands of her partner or someone she knows every week. This violence is preventable, and that we need to "create a new normal".

Honours and accolades

In 1999, she was appointed a Global Leader for Tomorrow by the World Economic Forum (WEF).

Despoja was awarded a Member of the Order of Australia in June 2011 for her "service to the Parliament of Australia, particularly as a Senator for South Australia, through leadership roles with the Australian Democrats, to education, and as a role model for women".

She is  listed as one of the "Gender Equality Top 100" by the UK organisation Apolitical.

In June 2019 Despoja was appointed as an Officer of the Order of Australia for her "distinguished service to the global community as an advocate for gender equality, and through roles in a range of organisations".

Personal life
Stott Despoja is married to former Liberal party advisor, Ian Smith and has two children.

Bibliography

Books

 Giving Generously (Artemis, 1996)
 DIY Feminism (Allen and Unwin, 1996)
 Collective Wisdom: Interviews with Prominent Australians (Clown, 1998)
 Free East Timor: Australia's Culpability in East Timor's Genocide (Random House, 1998)
 Goodbye normal gene: Confronting the Genetic Revolution (Pluto Press, 1999)
 What Women Want (Random House, 2002)
 Time for a Change: Australia in the 21st Century (Hardie Grant, 2006)
 Mother Who? Personal Stories and Insights on Juggling Family, Work and Life (Big Sky, 2007)
 On Violence (Melbourne University Press, March 2019)

Essays and reporting
 'Higher Education in Perspective', Current Affairs Bulletin, 1996
 'Personal and Private', Alternative Law Journal, 1997
 'Policy forum: the Junior Pay Rates Inquiry', Australian Economic Review, 1999
 'Leadership', Sydney Papers, 2001
 'Terror in the USA', The Asia–Australia Papers, 2001
 'The Human Genome Project: how do we protect Australians?', Medical Journal of Australia, 2000
 'ANZUS? ANZ who?' (with Senator Andrew Bartlett), Australian Journal of International Affairs, 2001
 'Towards a National Interest Commissioner', CEDA Bulletin, 2001
 'If I were Attorney-General', Alternative Law Journal, 2003
 'The first in human genetics regulation', Australasian Science, 2005
  'A brief look at the history of privacy', Australian Quarterly, 2007

References

Further reading
 Natasha Stott Despoja in The Encyclopedia of Women and Leadership in Twentieth Century Australia, entry by Nikki Henningham. (Includes links to selected other resources)

External links
Official site

 
 

 

Members of the Australian Senate
Australian Democrats members of the Parliament of Australia
Australian people of Croatian descent
Australian people of English descent
Australian republicans
Members of the Australian Senate for South Australia
People from Adelaide
University of Adelaide alumni
Women members of the Australian Senate
1969 births
Living people
People educated at Pembroke School, Adelaide
Delegates to the Australian Constitutional Convention 1998
20th-century Australian politicians
Members of the Order of Australia
Leaders of the Australian Democrats
20th-century Australian women politicians
21st-century Australian politicians
21st-century Australian women politicians
Officers of the Order of Australia